Warisaliganj railway station  is a major  railway station in Nawada district, Bihar. Its code is WRS.

Line and location 
The station lies on Tilaiya Junction–Luckeesarai Junction line of East Central Railway zone which is a part of Gaya–Kiul line

Infrastructure 
The station consists of three platforms and a rack point.

Importance 
It is also one of the important rack point for freight Wagons for Indian Railways in the Nawada district.

Services 
It serves Warisaliganj town to the district headquarter Nawada and other districts like Sheikhpura, Lakhisarai and Gaya. The town is served by a direct daily train to Howrah and a weekly service to Guwahati via Bhagalpur. The state capital Patna can be reached through a stop-over at Kiul Junction or Gaya Junction from where rest of India is well connected.

The following trains run from Warisaliganj railway station :

 Gaya–Howrah Express
 Gaya–Jamalpur Passenger (unreserved)
 Gaya–Kiul Passenger (unreserved)
 Gaya–Jhajha Fast Passenger (unreserved)
 Gaya–Kamakhya Weekly Express
 Rampurhat–Gaya Passenger (unreserved)

References

External links

Railway stations in Nawada district
Danapur railway division
Railway stations in India opened in 1879